Prebble as a surname may refer to the following:

Antonia Prebble, New Zealand actress
John Prebble, English/Canadian journalist
Lee Prebble, New Zealand record producer
Lucy Prebble, British writer
Mark Prebble, New Zealand public service commissioner
 Michael Prebble, leader of Scott Base for whom Prebble Glacier is named.
Peter Prebble, Canadian politician
Richard Prebble, New Zealand politician
Simon Prebble, English actor and narrator
Stuart Prebble, English broadcasting executive and author
W.M. Prebble, geologist after whom the Antarctic features Prebble Formation and Prebble Icefalls are named

See also
Preble (disambiguation)